Burlington Station or Burlington Depot may refer to:

In Canada
Burlington GO Station, Ontario

In the United States
Burlington Depot (Ottumwa, Iowa)
Burlington Depot (Bellevue, Nebraska)
Burlington Station (Hastings, Nebraska)
Burlington Station (Omaha, Nebraska), also known as Burlington Train Station
Burlington Depot (Red Cloud, Nebraska)

Amtrak stations in the United States
Burlington station (Iowa) in Burlington, Iowa
Burlington station (North Carolina) in Burlington, North Carolina
Union Station (Burlington, Vermont)
Essex Junction station in Essex Junction, Vermont, also serving the Burlington, Vermont area

See also
Burlington Northern Depot (disambiguation)
Burlington Cedar Rapids and Northern Depot (disambiguation)